Inner Dance is a 2010 solo album written and produced by Italian jazz guitarist Fabrizio Sotti. The album was recorded at both Avatar Studios and Sotti Studios in New York City in February and April 2009.

Inner Dance was recorded and mixed by Roy Hendrickson, with additional recording by Fabrizio Sotti and Giorgio Piovan.

The album is dedicated to Sotti's mother, Cristina, and was released by E1 Entertainment.

Track listing 
All songs written by Fabrizio Sotti except for #5, by Fabrizio Sotti and Claudia Acuna.
 Blue Whisper
 Kindness in Your Eyes
 Inner Dance (featuring Gregoire Maret)
 I Thought So
 Amanecer (featuring Claudia Acuna)
 Brief Talk
 Last Chance
 Mr. T.M.
 We Are What We Are

Personnel 
Fabrizio Sotti – electric guitar, nylon string guitar
Sam Barsh – organ
Victor Jones – drums
Mino Cinelu – drums and percussion
Gregoire Maret – harmonica on "Inner Dance"
Claudia Acuna – vocals on "Amanecer"
Produced by Fabrizio Sotti
Recording Engineer – Roy Hendrickson
Assistant Engineers – Akihiro Nishimura and Ilaria Ceccarelli
Mastering – Alan Silverman at Arf! Digital

References

2010 albums
Fabrizio Sotti albums